Åse Birkrem is a Norwegian handball player. She played 21 matches for the national handball team in 1986, and participated at the 1986 World Women's Handball Championship, where the Norwegian team won a bronze medal. She is a sister of Unni Birkrem.

References

Year of birth missing (living people)
Living people
Norwegian female handball players